Jean-Paul Cook (19 July 1927 – 29 June 2005) was a Social Credit party member of the House of Commons of Canada. He was born in Quebec City, Quebec and became an interior decorator and merchant by career.

He was first elected at the Montmagny—L'Islet riding in the 1962 general election and served one term, the 25th Parliament. In the 1963 federal election, he was defeated by Jean-Charles Richard Berger of the Liberal party.

External links
 

1927 births
2005 deaths
Members of the House of Commons of Canada from Quebec
Politicians from Quebec City
Place of death missing
Social Credit Party of Canada MPs